Al-Muabbada is a town in al-Hasakah Governorate, Syria. According to the Syria Central Bureau of Statistics (CBS), Al-Muabbada had a population of 15,759 in the 2004 census. According to the Kurdish news agency "Rudaw", the Ba'athist Party under President Hafez al-Assad changed the name of the town to Al-Muabbada. The town is 35 kilometres from the Iraqi border and 15 kilometres from the Turkish border. As of 2004, Al-Muabbada is the eighth largest town in Al-Hasakah governorate. The majority of the inhabitants of the town are Kurds with a large Arab minority.

Syrian Civil War

On 24 July 2012, the PYD announced that Syrian security forces withdrew from Al-Muabbada. The YPG forces afterwards took control of all government institutions and the town came fully under the PYD's control.

On 27 September 2022, 2 SDF fighters were killed in a Turkish drone strike on their car in the town.

References

Populated places in al-Malikiyah District
Towns in Syria
Kurdish communities in Syria